The 1946 Western Michigan Broncos football team was an American football team that represented Michigan College of Education (later renamed Western Michigan University) as an independent during the 1946 college football season.  In their fifth season under head coach John Gill, the Broncos compiled a 5–2–1 record and outscored their opponents, 158 to 100.  The team played its home games at Waldo Stadium in Kalamazoo, Michigan.

Tackle Clinton Brown was the team captain. Halfback Allen Bush received the team's most outstanding player award.

Schedule

References

Western Michigan
Western Michigan Broncos football seasons
Western Michigan Broncos football